Stefan Kozlov and Peter Polansky were the defending champions but withdrew from the tournament due to a Kozlov injury.

Tennys Sandgren and Mikael Torpegaard won the title after defeating Luca Margaroli and Yasutaka Uchiyama 5–7, 6–4, [10–5] in the final.

Seeds

Draw

References

External links
 Main draw

Columbus Challenger - Doubles